Fu Wenjun (Chinese: 傅文俊; pinyin: Fù Wénjùn, born 1955) graduated from Sichuan Fine Arts Institute. He is a contemporary artist who works on photography, digital art, installation art, sculpture, and oil painting. Currently, he lives and works at Chongqing. He has developed his concept and practices of “Digital Pictorial Photography” art style.

Main exhibitions

Main solo exhibitions 
2010: Spirit Icon, Old Summer Palace, Beijing.
2010: Story of Two Parks, Chongqing Library, Chongqing.
2010: Show of Formality II, Move the Old Summer Palace 1400 km South, Fei Contemporary Art Center, Shanghai.
2010: Show of Formality, Fu Wenjun's Photographic Exhibition of Historical Concept, Today Art Museum, Beijing.
2013: Thought Reading, Fu Wenjun Conceptual Photography Exhibition, Miami, FL.
2014: Conceptual photographic show of Illusory Metamorphoses grass cloth collection, Miami, FL.
2015: Photographic Narrative, Fu Wenjun's Conceptual Photography Solo Exhibition. United Nations Headquarters, New York City, FL.
2015: 迷思之像Thoughtful images. Guangdong Museum of Art, Guangzhou; 1–14 October 2015.
2017: Harmony in Diversity Fu Wenjun's Digital Painting Photography Exhibition. National Art Museum of China, Beijing, China.
2017: Introspection of Soul Artistic Expression in the Digital Pictorial Photography of Wenjun Fu. Museu Europeu d'Art Modern, Barcelona, Spain
2018:"Is It Photography – Fu Wenjun Digital Pictorial Photography Solo Exhibition", Dairy Arts Center, Boulder, USA
2019:"Digital Brush: The Photographic Process of Fu Wenjun", The University of Hong Kong, Hong Kong
2019 "Again Enter the Scene --- Fu Wenjun Digital Pictorial Photography Exhibition", Chongqing Art Museum, Chongqing, China.

Main collective exhibitions 
2009: 36th Rendez Vous a Paris, the Grand Palais des Champs-Elysées and Musée du Louvre, Paris.
2009: 35th Japan AJAC Yokohama International Overseas Artists Exhibition, Yokohama Art Museum, Yokohama.
2010: Salon des Indépendants, the Grand Palais des Champs-Elysées, Paris.
2010: Welding, International Tour Exhibition of the Chinese Contemporary Art in the first ten years of the 21st Century, Gemeentemuseum Den Haag, the Hague.
2012: Conceptual Renewal: A Short History of Chinese Contemporary Photography, Si Shang Art Museum, Beijing
2013: International Heritage Show, Carrousels du Louvre, Paris.
2013: Voice of the Unseen Chinese Independent Art 1979/Today, collateral exhibition of Venice Art Biennale 2013, Venice.
2014: Tour Eiffel La Grande Exposition Universelle, Paris, France.
2014: 2nd International Biennial of Contemporary Art in Argentina, Buenos Aires, Argentina.
2014: Art Palm Beach, Palm Beach, Florida, USA.
2015: XVIII Bienal de Cerveira, Cerveira, Portugal.
2015: Nord Art 2015, Büdelsdorf, Germany.
2015: Milan Image Art Fair (MIA), Milan, Italy.
2015: X Florence Biennale, Florence (Italy)
2015: 1st Asia Biennial/5th Guangzhou Triennial, Guangzhou (China)
2016 11th Rome International Biennale of Art, Rome, Italy.
2016: Biennale Riviera del Brenta, Venice (Italy)
2016: The Working of Non-Figurative System, Right View Art Museum, Beijing (China)
2016: Peninsula Fine Arts Center Biennial 2016, Peninsula Fine Arts Center (USA)
2016: Triennale dell’Arte Contemporanea, Verona (Italy)
2017: Biennale Internazionale d’Arte del Mediterraneo, Palermo, Italy
2017: London Art Biennale, London, UK
2017: Esposizione Triennale di Arti Visive a Roma, Rome, Italy
2018 International Contemporary Masters Exhibition, Las Vegas Art Museum, Las Vegas (USA)
2018 Biennale delle Nazioni, la Scuola Grande della Misericodia, Venice (Italy)
2018 World Art Dubai, Dubai World Trade Center, Dubai (UAE)
2018 ARTMUC, Munich (Germany)
2018 Chianciano International Art Biennale，Chianciano Art Museum, Chianciano, (Italy)
2018 Shanghai，Shanghai Exhibition Center, Shanghai (China)
2018 Fine Art Asia，Hong Kong Convention and Exhibition Center, Hong Kong (China)
2018 Biennale d’Arte Contemporanea di Salerno，Salerno (Italy)
2018 Art Miami，Miami (USA)
2019 Palm Beach Modern + Contemporary，Palm Beach (USA)
2019 The Photography Show presented by AIPAD, New York (USA)

Main work's presentation 
Misplacement 2017–2018 — Fu Wenjun's creative output can be summed up by his term Digital Pictorial Photography, which he uses to redefine the traditions found at the core of the photographic arts. By blending elements of other artistic media into the process, he creates a brand-new form of aesthetic pleasure. Fu Wenjun embraces a range of art forms, combining them into unique and monumental works that reach beyond the mere act of recording a photographic image. His work brings together the practical aspect of photography with the aesthetic nature of other forms of visual arts. By demonstrating the complementary relationship of photographs and other modes of artistic practice, Fu Wenjun transforms what may seem to be an inaccessible message into a highly approachable concept that can trigger critical thought about history and humanity.

Thoughtful Images 2014–2015 — Fu Wenjun tells us, through idiomatic images, about questions which are as old as human species. Doubts and realities which grip mankind since ancient times, but which are at the same time really actual reality, a reality proved by using arcane signs, violently projected and sounded out, but still preserving integrity. We are talking about signs which are impressed in the general unconscious. That means that, beyond their historical value, they own an absolute and unconscious existence, innately associated to a concept, also in the unspoilt minds.

Pick at Random 2012 — The symbols of various cultures are juxtaposed, in order to create new meanings by making use of different art languages from different times and places.

Totem 2012 — Through the use of the newest multimedia montage, the visual effect of this work is extreme. The multimedia artistic language makes the work's display and its transmission different from the medium itself, so the perceived relationship between the subjective viewer and the objective photography is changed.
Luo Yiping, Curator of the Guangdong Museum of Art

Story of Expo Park 2013 – In 1900, the Eight-Nation Alliance (the United Kingdom, Russia, Germany, France, the United States, Japan, Italy and Austria) invaded China, leading to the tragedy that happened at the Summer Palace. After more than one hundred years, they came again to China and built their national pavilions in Shanghai Expo Park. In this work, the ruins of the Summer Palace are juxtaposed with their national pavilions; the open notebook seems like a history book, recording and telling the great changes in its history. It shows that China has released the heavy cultural burden, has formed a new national and cultural attitude of self-confidence due to the contact with the new world.

Thought Reading 2010–2011 – The radiography technology is used to imitate the human body's skull image, in order to present ideas in the human head. Buddhist sculptures take the place of the contents of the brain tissue, which makes the work present the superposition of the fictional with the authentic.

Echo 2009 – In this work, the Chinese national emblem is added to photos of obsolete buildings and industrial installations, with speckled colors. This refers to the disappearance of the cultural subjectivity under the control of national authoritarianism in the industrial civilization.

A Wind from Yesterday 2016–2017 — In the series A Wind from Yesterday, Fu Wenjun superposes the images of a page made from woodblock printing in Song Dynasty and the euphrates poplar, leading the nature and the civilization to set each other off beautifully. Both of the two objects have gone through the test of a long time, so as symbols of time can evoke people's nostalgia towards the ancient era. The works embody a taste that is very close to the “classic elegance” proposed by the modern Chinese scholar Wang Guowei. This scholar regarded the “classic elegance” as a very special interest in the Chinese aesthetics. A Wind from Yesterday represents one of the few photography works that can give expression to this Chinese aesthetic spirit. (By Peng Feng, Professor at Peking University School of Arts and curator of the Chinese Pavilion at the 54th Biennale di Venezia)

Harmony in Diversity 2016–2017 — Harmony in Diversity can be seen as a variant of A Wind from Yesterday, in which Fu Wenjun replaced the Euphrates poplar with the superposition of Western classic sculptures and Chinese ancient paintings. Then the dialogue between nature and civilization has developed into the dialogue between Chinese and Western culture. It is evident that they represent two completely different aesthetic ideals: the Western sculptures pursue a perfect form, while the Chinese paintings adore a light and intangible spirit. But with the superposition processed by Wenjun, they do not appear to be inharmonious. In his own special way, the artist interprets the harmony in diversity, which represents a wisdom contributing to the continuous development of Chinese civilization and can untie the hard knot of culture diversity and clash of civilizations. (By Peng Feng, Professor at Peking University School of Arts and curator of the Chinese Pavilion at the 54th Biennale di Venezia)

Collection
His artworks are collected by Museu Europeu d'Art Modern, National Art Museum of China, Today Art Museum, University Museum and Art Gallery The University of Hong Kong， the Old Summer Palace Museum, Tokyo Metropolitan Art Museum, Kennedy Family, World Council of Peoples for the United Nations, Dazu Grotto Museum, Chongqing Art Museum, Guangdong Museum of Art, Société Nationale des Beaux Arts of France, Egypt Ahmed Shawki Museum and other significant organizations and collectors.

References

External links
 Fu Wenjun’s Website 
 of Acclaimed Chinese Artist Fu Wenjun with American Writer Stacy Conde
 Voice of the Unseen
 Nordart 2015
 China Daily: When photographs look like paintings
 China Daily: Artist explores abstract concepts to create 3D sculptures

1955 births
Living people
Painters from Chongqing
Sichuan Fine Arts Institute alumni
Chinese contemporary artists
Chinese photographers